Anders Jacob Ehnmark (2 June 1931 – 29 March 2019) was a Swedish author and journalist.

Biography 
Ehnmark was born in Linköping, Östergötland County, Sweden. He earned a B.A. from Uppsala University in 1960, and an honorary doctorate from Göteborg University in 1993. From 1956 to 1972, he was employed by the Swedish newspaper Expressen and was its independent columnist starting in 1995. In the early 1970s, Ehnmark was employed at the Swedish communist newspaper Norrskensflamman. He was also employed at the journal Folket i Bild/Kulturfront. Around 1980, he became a member of the Left Party – Communists.

Ehnmark died on March 29, 2019. He was married to journalist Annika Hagström from 1976 until his death.

Bibliography 
Angola (1962)
Cuba cubana (1963)
Guerrilla (1968)
Rapport från det röda Emilien (1969)
Exemplet Guinea-Bissau (1973)
Jag är jävligt optimistisk (1973)
Tusen fasta viljor (1974)
Karamellkoket (1976)
Chez nous (1976, co-author: Per Olov Enquist)
Mannen på trottoaren (1979)
Palatset (1979)
Ögonvittnet (1980)
Doktor Mabuses nya testamente (1982, co-author: Per Olov Enquist))
Arvskifte (1983)
Maktens hemligheter (1986)
Protagoras sats (1987)
Slottet (1990)
Rättvisa och makt (1992)
Resan till Kilimanjaro (1993)
Tre essäer om befrielse och frihet (1994)
Den döda vinkeln (1994)
Resa i skuggan (1995)
Minnets hemlighet (1999)
Frihetens rike (2001)
Krigsvinter (2002)
Tal på Övralid 6 juli 2002 (2002)
En stad i ljus (2005)

Awards and honors 
 1993 – Honorary doctorate (University of Gothenburg)
 1998 – John Landquist Prize (Samfundet De Nio)
 2002 – Övralid Prize (Övralid Foundation)

References

External links 
 Presentation at Norstedts 

1931 births
2019 deaths
People from Linköping
Uppsala University alumni
Swedish journalists
Swedish male writers
Swedish communists